Zana Krasniqi (born September 17, 1988 in Pristina) is a Kosovar fashion model and beauty pageant titleholder who won Miss Universe Kosovo 2008. She represented Kosovo for the first time in Miss Universe and placed in the Top 10 of the Miss Universe 2008.

Personal life
Zana Krasniqi comes from a background of entertainers including her father Naim Krasniqi, a singer in Kosovo. On April 4, 2008, Fadil Berisha, the photographer of Miss Universe's official photos, hosted the inaugural "Miss Universe Kosova" pageant where Krasniqi was crowned and represented Kosovo in the Miss Universe pageant.
Zana was trained by photographer Fadil Berisha. who worked with the Miss Universe organization, and is a fellow Kosovar Albanian. Her interests include singing, performing and modelling. Her career ambition is to be a fashion designer.

See also 

 Albanians in Kosovo
 Kosovo
 Miss Universe 2008

Notes and references
Notes:

References:

1988 births
Living people
People from Pristina
Miss Universe 2008 contestants
Kosovo Albanians
Kosovan beauty pageant winners